Royal Antwerp Football Club, often simply referred to as R. Antwerp or simply Antwerp, is an association football club from Antwerp, Belgium. The team has participated in sixteen seasons of Union of European Football Associations (UEFA) club competitions, including one season in the European Cup, fourteen seasons in the Inter Cities Fairs Cup, UEFA Cup and Europa League, one season in the Cup Winners' Cup.  The club's first appearance was in the 1957–58 European Cup. Since then, the club has participated in various seasons of the UEFA club competitions, with various success. Their best performance was reaching the final of the UEFA Cup Winners' Cup in 1993, where Antwerp lost 3–1 to Italian side Parma.

Total statistics
As of home match with Olympiacos.

Statistics by country
As of home match with Olympiacos.

Matches

Summary of best results
From the quarter-finals upwards:

UEFA Cup Winners' Cup (1):
- Runners-up in 1993.
UEFA Cup/UEFA Europa League:
- Quarter-finalists in 1990.

References

Royal Antwerp F.C.
Antwerp